Catatropis is a genus of trematodes belonging to the family Notocotylidae.

The species of this genus are found in Europe, America, Australia.

Species:

Catatropis chilinae
Catatropis cygni 
Catatropis harwoodi 
Catatropis hatcheri
Catatropis hisikui 
Catatropis johnstoni 
Catatropis lagunae 
Catatropis pacifera 
Catatropis verrucosa

References

Platyhelminthes